Mary White (born 24 November 1948) is a former Irish Green Party politician who served as a Minister of State from 2010 to 2011 and Deputy Leader of the Green Party from 2001 to 2011. She served as a Teachta Dála (TD) for the Carlow–Kilkenny constituency from 2007 to 2011.

Early and personal life
White was born in Bray, County Wicklow, educated at the Ursuline Convent, Waterford and Trinity College Dublin. At Trinity, she was a founding member of the English Society and received a Pink (award) for sporting excellence. She is married to Robert White and has one daughter. They have lived in Borris, County Carlow since 1987. She has co-edited a book on walking in the Blackstairs Mountains with Joss Lynam and authored another, Environment, Mining and Politics. She is also a keen hill-walker, linguist and organic grower.

Political career
She was an unsuccessful candidate at the 1997 general election and 2002 general election, but was elected to Carlow County Council at the 1999 local elections. She topped the poll in the Borris local electoral area, and was re-elected at the 2004 local elections, serving until 2007. She also ran for Seanad Éireann in 2002 but only received 35 votes.

In 2004, she was the Green Party candidate at the European Parliament election for the East constituency, seeking to succeed outgoing Green MEP Nuala Ahern. She secured 5.6% of the first preference vote but was not elected.

She was elected to Dáil Éireann at the 2007 general election, making her the first female TD elected for the Green party and for the Carlow–Kilkenny constituency.

On 23 March 2010, as part of a reshuffle, she was appointed as Minister of State at the Department of Justice and Law Reform, at the Department of Children and Youth Affairs and the Department of Education and Skills, with special responsibility for Equality, Human Rights and Integration.

She resigned as Minister of State on 23 January 2011, when the Green Party withdrew from government.

She lost her seat at the 2011 general election. She was subsequently replaced as Deputy Leader of the Green Party by Catherine Martin.

References

 

1948 births
Living people
Alumni of Trinity College Dublin
Green Party (Ireland) TDs
Local councillors in County Carlow
Members of the 30th Dáil
21st-century women Teachtaí Dála
Ministers of State of the 30th Dáil
Politicians from County Wicklow
Women ministers of state of the Republic of Ireland